The Kerala Film Critics Association Award for Best Director is an award presented annually at the Kerala Film Critics Association Awards of India to the best director in Malayalam cinema.

Superlatives

Winners

See also
 Kerala Film Critics Association Award for Best Film

References

Director
Awards for best director